Augustan is an adjective which means pertaining to Augustus or Augusta. It can refer to:

Augustan Age (disambiguation)
Augustan  literature (ancient Rome)
Augustan prose
Augustan poetry
Augustan  Reprint Society
Augustan literature
Augustan History
Augustan drama
Augustan Society
A current or former resident of Augusta, Georgia
See also
Legio I Augusta or First Augustan Legion
Legio II Augusta or Second Augustan Legion
Legio III Augusta or Third Augustan Legion
Gemma Augustea or Augustan jewel
Arch of Augustus (disambiguation) or Augustan Arch
Closed couplet or Augustan couplet
Heroic couplet or Augustan heroic couplet
Ara Pacis or Altar of Augustan Peace
Augsburg Confession or Augustan Confession